MYCBP associated protein is a protein that in humans is encoded by the MYCBPAP gene.

References

Further reading